Esmaël Ruti Tavares Cruz da Silva Gonçalves (born 25 June 1991), also known as Isma, is a Bissau-Guinean footballer who plays as a center forward and winger for Scottish club Raith Rovers on loan from Livingston and the Guinea-Bissau national team.

Club career

Nice
Gonçalves was born in Bissau, the capital city of Guinea-Bissau, but moved to Portugal with his family at the age of three. He began his football career with Boavista. Gonçalves spent three years at the club before venturing to France to sign with Nice after being invited for a trial at the club. Prior to signing with the club, he drew interest from English club Liverpool. Gonçalves spent two years in Nice's youth academy before earning promotion to the club's reserve team in the Championnat de France amateur 2 for the 2010–11 season. Following a successful half season at reserve level, he was called up to the senior team in January 2011 and made his professional debut in a 2–0 defeat to Bordeaux, appearing as a substitute. That was his only senior team appearance of the campaign.

On 30 June 2011, Gonçalves signed his first professional contract, agreeing to a three-year deal until 2014. He was officially promoted to the senior team by manager Eric Roy and assigned the number 24 shirt for the 2011–12 season. He scored twice that season, including the winner in a 4–3 victory at Lyon on the last day, 20 May 2012.

Rio Ave
On 3 August 2012, Nice confirmed on its official website that Gonçalves would be returning to Portugal to join first division club Rio Ave. Gonçalves had previously expressed his desire to join the Vila do Conde-based club in order to be near his family.

St Mirren (loan)
On 22 January 2013, Gonçalves signed on loan with Scottish Premier League club St Mirren until the end of the 2012–13 season. The day after signing, he was quoted in the local newspaper Paisley Daily Express that he could be "the next Drogba".

Gonçalves scored his first goal for the club on his debut in the Scottish League Cup semi-final in a 3–2 win over Celtic at Hampden Park, with his being the club's first goal against the Glasgow side since March 2010. Three days later, he made his first Scottish Premier League appearance against Inverness Caledonian Thistle, nutmegging the goalkeeper in a 2–1 victory. In his first Scottish Cup appearance against St Johnstone, Gonçalves scored both goals of a 2–0 victory. He scored another goal against Celtic at St Mirren Park in a 2–1 loss in the sixth round of the Scottish Cup.

On 17 March 2013, Gonçalves played in the Scottish League Cup final against Hearts where he scored the equalising goal and provided an assist for Conor Newton's third in a 3–2 victory Buddies' first League Cup and their first major trophy since 1987. Shortly after scoring, he lifted his jersey, which had the inscription "Forca Fábio Faria" ("Come on Fábio Faria"), dedicating a goal to a player whose career ended after a heart condition. Gonçalves was then booked by the referee.

In a 1–1 draw against Celtic on 31 March, Gonçalves caused controversy when he dived to win the penalty after being fouled by Emilio Izaguirre, with television pictures proving that there was no contact. After the match, he was given a two-match ban by the SFA, following an issue of complaint for his action of diving, which he accepted. He told BBC Scotland that he would be happy to make a return to St. Mirren in the future. The club was willing to make his transfer permanent, but Rio Ave announced that this would not be the case, and said that such a deal would cost £400,000.

APOEL (loan)
On 3 July 2013, Gonçalves completed a season-long loan move to Cypriot side APOEL.

He scored on his debut against NK Maribor at GSP Stadium on 31 July, opening the scoring in a 1–1 first leg draw for the third qualifying round of the 2013–14 UEFA Champions League. On 24 October, he scored the equaliser against Bordeaux in APOEL's 2–1 defeat at Stade Chaban-Delmas for the third matchday of the UEFA Europa League group stage. He scored his first league goals in APOEL's 5–0 home victory against AEK Kouklia on 2 December, in a match which Gonçalves managed to score a hat-trick. On 31 December, APOEL terminated his contract by mutual consent.

On 14 January 2014, Veria signed Gonçalves on a one-year loan deal. He scored his first Superleague goal in a defeat to PAOK.

Heart of Midlothian
After a stint in Cyprus with Anorthosis, Gonçalves signed for Scottish Premiership club Heart of Midlothian in January 2017. Hearts paid a transfer fee of about £170,000 for his services and he made his debut in a 4–1 win over Rangers on 1 February. Gonçalves scored 15 goals in 42 appearances for Hearts, until he was sold to Pakhtakor Tashkent for £350,000 in January 2018.

Asia

Gonçalves signed for Uzbek club Pakhtakor Tashkent in January 2018.

On 26 January 2019, Gonçalves moved to Esteghlal on an 18-month-long contract. He was given the squad shirt number 20. He made his debut for the club on 7 February, in a 4–0 win against Paykan, coming on as an 81st-minute substitute for Morteza Tabrizi. He scored his first goal for Esteghlal in the same game just two minutes after coming on as a substitute. On 1 June, Esteghlal announced Isma's contract was terminated by mutual consent.

Gonçalves signed for Japanese club Matsumoto Yamaga in September 2019. On 23 November, he made his debut for the Japanese side as a substitute in a 1–0 defeat against Yokohama F. Marinos.

On 11 October 2020, Gonçalves joined Indian Super League club Chennaiyin FC on a one year contract. On 24 November 2020, Gonçalves made his debut in the very first match of the season for Chennnaiyin FC and converted a crucial 26th minute penalty in a 2–1 win for Chennaiyin over Jamshedpur.

Gonçalves would spend a season with Bangladesh Premier League side Sheikh Russel KC.

Livingston 
On 31 May 2022, Gonçalves returned to Scotland and signed a two-year deal with Scottish Premiership side Livingston. He was loaned to Championship club Raith Rovers on 11 February 2023, and later that day scored in a Scottish Cup tie against Motherwell.

International career
Though born in Guinea-Bissau, Gonçalves is a naturalised citizen of Portugal. He has represented them at under-17 level. In 2010, he was called up to the Portugal under-20 team to participate in training sessions as the team was preparing for the 2011 FIFA U-20 World Cup. Gonçalves, however, showed up to the camp out of shape and was, ultimately, not considered for the tournament by coach Ilídio Vale.

He earned one cap for Guinea-Bissau on 22 March 2018, starting in a 2–0 friendly loss to Burkina Faso in Limeil-Brévannes, France.

Career statistics

Honours

Club
St Mirren
 Scottish League Cup: 2012–13

APOEL
 Cypriot Super Cup: 2013

Individual
Uzbekistan Super League top goalscorer: 2018

References

External links

 APOEL official profile
 
 
 
 
 
 

Living people
1991 births
Sportspeople from Bissau
Bissau-Guinean footballers
Guinea-Bissau international footballers
Portuguese footballers
Portugal youth international footballers
Bissau-Guinean expatriate footballers
Bissau-Guinean emigrants to Portugal
Portuguese expatriate footballers
OGC Nice players
Rio Ave F.C. players
St Mirren F.C. players
APOEL FC players
Veria F.C. players
Anorthosis Famagusta F.C. players
Ettifaq FC players
Heart of Midlothian F.C. players
Pakhtakor Tashkent FK players
Esteghlal F.C. players
Matsumoto Yamaga FC players
Ligue 1 players
Primeira Liga players
Super League Greece players
Cypriot First Division players
Scottish Premier League players
Scottish Professional Football League players
Saudi First Division League players
Persian Gulf Pro League players
J1 League players
J2 League players
Association football wingers
Association football forwards
Bissau-Guinean expatriate sportspeople in France
Expatriate footballers in France
Bissau-Guinean expatriate sportspeople in Scotland
Expatriate footballers in Scotland
Portuguese expatriate sportspeople in Scotland
Bissau-Guinean expatriate sportspeople in Cyprus
Expatriate footballers in Cyprus
Portuguese expatriate sportspeople in Cyprus
Bissau-Guinean expatriate sportspeople in Saudi Arabia
Expatriate footballers in Saudi Arabia
Bissau-Guinean expatriate sportspeople in Uzbekistan
Expatriate footballers in Uzbekistan
Bissau-Guinean expatriate sportspeople in Iran
Expatriate footballers in Iran
Portuguese expatriate sportspeople in Iran
Bissau-Guinean expatriate sportspeople in Japan
Expatriate footballers in Japan
Expatriate footballers in India
Bissau-Guinean expatriate sportspeople in India
Portuguese expatriate sportspeople in India
Indian Super League players
Chennaiyin FC players
Livingston F.C. players
Bangladesh Premier League players
Sheikh Russel KC players
Raith Rovers F.C. players